The 1961 Lamar Tech Cardinals football team represented Lamar State College of Technology—now known as Lamar University—as a member of the Lone Star Conference (LSC) during the 1961 NCAA College Division football season. Led by ninth-year head coach James B. Higgins, the Cardinals compiled an overall record of an 8–2–1 with a mark of 4–2–1 in conference play, placing third in the LSC. Lamar Tech was invited to the Tangerine Bowl, where the beat Middle Tennessee, 21–14.

Schedule

References

Lamar Tech
Lamar Cardinals football seasons
Citrus Bowl champion seasons
Lamar Tech Cardinals football